John Francis Cunningham (June 20, 1842 – June 23, 1919) was an Irish-born prelate of the Roman Catholic Church. He served as Bishop of Concordia from 1898 until his death in 1919.

Life
John Cunningham was born in Irremore, County Kerry, and received his early education in Listowel. After coming to the United States in 1860, he enrolled at St. Benedict's College in Atchison, Kansas. He completed his theological studies at St. Francis' Seminary in Milwaukee, Wisconsin, and was ordained to the priesthood by Bishop John Baptiste Miège, S.J., on August 8, 1865.

Cunningham carried out his priestly ministry in the Diocese of Leavenworth, where was charged by Bishop Louis Mary Fink, O.S.B., with securing funds to pay off the remaining debt on the cathedral and with helping Kansan settlers during the depressed economy of the period. He was pastor of the Church of the Assumption in Topeka from 1877 until 1881, when he became vicar general. He also served as rector of the cathedral.

On May 14, 1898, Cunningham was appointed the second Bishop of Concordia by Pope Leo XIII. He received his episcopal consecration on the following September 21 from Archbishop John Joseph Kain, with Bishops John Joseph Hennessy and Thomas Bonacum serving as co-consecrators, at Leavenworth. Described as the "Diocesan Builder," Cunningham erected 54 churches, 22 schools, and three hospitals during his tenure. He also dedicated the cathedral and laid the cornerstone for the Nazareth Motherhouse in 1902, and founded Hays Catholic College and St. Joseph's Orphanage in addition to several rectories and convents.

Cunningham died after an extended illness, aged 76. He was buried in the Nazareth Cemetery at Concordia.

References

External links
Helen's Family Trees (page relating to Bishop Cunningham's parents, John Cunningham and Catherine Fitzgerald)

1842 births
1919 deaths
Clergy from County Kerry
People from Listowel
Irish emigrants to the United States (before 1923)
Roman Catholic Archdiocese of Kansas City in Kansas
Roman Catholic bishops of Concordia
19th-century Roman Catholic bishops in the United States
20th-century Roman Catholic bishops in the United States